The Convent is a 1995 film by Portuguese director Manoel de Oliveira, starring Catherine Deneuve and John Malkovich and is inspired by an original idea by Agustina Bessa-Luís in her novel As terras do risco. It was entered into the main competition of the 1995 Cannes Film Festival.

Plot
The film opens when a Paris-based American professor Michael Padovic and his elegant French wife Hélène arrive at an ancient Portuguese convent in Arrábida where he believes the documents needed to prove his theory might be in its archives: Shakespeare was born in Spain named Jacques Perez, and was Jewish. 

The couple is greeted by an enigmatic stranger who refers to himself as Baltar; he is the guardian of the monastery. Baltar introduced them to Berta, the housekeeper and his assistant Baltazar. For his research work, Padovic spends most of his days in the library with the beautiful librarian Piedade, while Hélène is accompanied by Baltar who eventually professes his love towards the elegant lady. 

As the tension increases to its dramatic climax, the film ends with an epilogue in the form of on-screen text from a fisherman's report. Baltar and Piedade went missing after a forest fire; Michael and Hélène "left immediately" and are leading a normal life in Paris; Michael abandoned his research on Jacques Perez and is studying occult sciences instead. It nevertheless warns the audience that the fisherman's report might not be reliable.

Cast
 Catherine Deneuve as Hélène
 John Malkovich as Michael Padovic
 Luís Miguel Cintra as Baltar
 Leonor Silveira as Piedade
 Duarte de Almeida as Baltazar
 Heloísa Miranda as Berta
 Gilberto Gonçalves as Fisherman

Music 
The film centers at the question of Evil vs Good and Devil vs God. Essential to the brooding atmosphere is Oliveira's choice of music by Sofia Gubaidulina (Offertorium, Sieben Worte), and portions of Igor Stravinsky’s “The Rake’s Progress” and Toshiro Mayuzumi’s “Prelude, for String Quartet.”

Reception
In Portugal, the film was the most popular Portuguese film in 1995 with admissions of 35,000. It received positive reviews in the U.S. from Los Angeles Times, New York Times and Chicago Reader.

References

External links
 
 

1995 films
Portuguese thriller drama films
French thriller drama films
Films based on Portuguese novels
Films based on thriller novels
Films based on works by Agustina Bessa-Luís
Films directed by Manoel de Oliveira
Films produced by Paulo Branco
English-language French films
English-language Portuguese films
1990s thriller drama films
1995 drama films
Films shot in Portugal
1990s French films